Liu Quankun (born 17 February 1983 in China) is a former Chinese-born Hong Kong professional footballer who played as a defender.

Club career
Liu spent his youth career in Dalian Shide and moved to Hong Kong in 2003 when he started to play for Kitchee.

On 30 April 2008, in the 2008 AFC Cup group match against Singapore Armed Forces, Liu removed his shirt to fan his team-mate Lo Chi Hin, who had collapsed unconscious after suffering a suspected heart attack. Liu has subsequently received a second yellow card from the Sri Lankan referee Hettikamkanamge Perera due to the removal of shirt. In July, Liu received a formal apology from Mohammed Bin Hammam, the President of Asian Football Confederation, for this wrong red card given.

On 2 February 2015, Liu transferred to China League One side Harbin Yiteng.

International career
He was eligible to represent Hong Kong national football team after staying in Hong Kong for two years. He made his international debut on 1 February 2006 in 2006 Carlsberg Cup third-place match versus Croatia national football team.

Career statistics

International
As of 10 September 2013

References

External links
 KitChee.com, Player Info 
 Liu Quankun at HKFA

1983 births
Living people
Chinese footballers
Hong Kong footballers
Hong Kong expatriate footballers
Chinese expatriate footballers
Kitchee SC players
Zhejiang Yiteng F.C. players
Hong Kong First Division League players
China League One players
Hong Kong international footballers
Footballers at the 2006 Asian Games
Association football defenders
Asian Games competitors for Hong Kong